Krabozavodskoye, also known as Anama, is a village (selo) in Yuzhno-Kurilsky District of Sakhalin Oblast, Russia.

References

Rural localities in Sakhalin Oblast